Tero Föhr (born 1 August 1980) is a Finnish orienteering competitor. He received a silver medal in the middle distance at the 2007 World Orienteering Championships in Kyiv. He also participated on the Finnish team that achieved a bronze medal in the championship relay 2007 and 2009.

Föhr won his first international victory when he won the long distance World Cup race at Siggerud, Norway, in 2008 – 2 seconds ahead of Swedish Emil Wingstedt.

See also
 Finnish orienteers
 List of orienteers
 List of orienteering events

References

External links

1980 births
Living people
Finnish orienteers
Male orienteers
Foot orienteers
World Orienteering Championships medalists

World Games silver medalists
Competitors at the 2009 World Games
World Games medalists in orienteering